Herschel Grammar School is a co-educational grammar school  with academy status, located in Slough, Berkshire, England. The headteacher is Mrs Joanne Rockall. The school has around 900 pupils, 250 of whom are in the sixth form.

History
The school was established in town centre buildings formerly occupied by Slough Secondary School in William Street (a site later occupied by the Slough campus of Thames Valley University) in about 1952. In 1958, the school moved to a purpose-built site on Northampton Avenue, occupying land that had (before the Second World War) been used as 'Timbertown', an area of temporary houses. The school has remained at Northampton Avenue, although for the 1988/89 academic year it temporarily moved to the site of the former Orchard Secondary Modern School while the permanent buildings were refurbished after damage to the roof in the storms of 1987.

Within its present buildings, the school has had a number of names and forms, including:

Slough Technical School
Slough Technical High School (to 1972)
Herschel High School (1972 to 1984)
Sir William Herschel Grammar School (from 1984)
Herschel Grammar School

In 2004, the school completed a sports centre, which now serves as Herschel Sports to the public when out of school hours. The sports complex includes a full-size astro-turf football, hockey pitch, four full-size tennis courts, six full-size indoor badminton courts, one full-size indoor basketball court, a dance studio and changing facilities with lockers. Although the school is small compared to other schools.

Sixth form
The school has a sixth form of about 325 pupils, both from the lower school and pupils who have moved from other schools.There is a sixth form block. The sixth form is a part of the Herschel Consortium.  The pupils in the sixth form have a common room that is used for studying as well as more general recreational and relaxing activities during non-contact time. In September 2018 the silent study room and common room were upgraded and pupils are timetabled to spend some non-lesson time in a supervised study room, as well as a study period in the exam hall.

Prefects
The school has a prefect system. Year 12s are able to apply to be Junior Prefects and in the latter part of Year 12, twelve prefects including a Head Boy and Head Girl are elected by the students and teachers in the Sixth Form and Year 11. The prefects occupy their positions until the end of Year 13.

School links
Herschel Grammar School is part of the Schelwood Trust: an educational trust comprising Beechwood School and Herschel Grammar School.

Herschel Grammar School was a founding member-school of the Herschel Consortium - a co-operation of the sixth forms of Herschel Grammar School, The Westgate School and Baylis Court School, all of which are within the same district of Slough.

Notable former pupils
 Gareth Unwin, Film Producer, The King's Speech
 Iain Lee, broadcaster
 Brian McDermott, footballer and manager of Reading FC.
 Ryan Bird, footballer

Notes and references

External links
 Official website
 Ofsted Report

Grammar schools in Slough
Academies in Slough